Adlan Zelimkhanovich Katsayev (born 20 February 1988) is a Russian football attacking midfielder.

Career
Katsayev made his professional debut on 19 November 2005, coming as a substitute for Terek in the Russian Premier League game against Tom.

In the second part of 2007 season he was loaned to Russian Second Division's Kavkaztransgaz-2005 alongside his Terek teammate Rizvan Utsiyev.

Anzhi Makhachkala
In January 2017, Katsayev joined FC Anzhi Makhachkala, extending his loan deal with Anzhi for another year in June 2017. His loan was terminated and he returned to Akhmat on 17 January 2018.

Career statistics

Club

External links
 
 
  Career stats at 90minut.pl

References

1988 births
People from Achkhoy-Martanovsky District
Living people
Chechen people
Russian people of Chechen descent
Russian footballers
Association football midfielders
FC Akhmat Grozny players
FC Luch Vladivostok players
Russian expatriate footballers
Expatriate footballers in Poland
Lechia Gdańsk players
Russian Premier League players
FC SKA-Khabarovsk players
FC Anzhi Makhachkala players
Sportspeople from Chechnya